Selective memory can mean any of the following:

 Confirmation bias, the tendency to search for, interpret, favor, and recall information in a way that confirms one's preexisting beliefs or hypotheses.
 Lacunar amnesia,  the loss of memory about one specific event. 
Selective amnesia, the loss of memory about certain things